Steven Baldas (born 18 June 1974) is an Australian sports administrator and former professional tennis player.

Baldas, a native of Adelaide, attended Saint Ignatius' College.

In 1992, Baldas partnered with Scott Draper to win the Wimbledon junior doubles championship, over Mahesh Bhupathi and Nitten Kirrtane in the final. He finished the year ranked three in the world junior doubles rankings.

Baldas featured in the men's doubles main draw of the 1993 Australian Open partnering Mark Draper.

From 1995 to 1998, Baldas played collegiate tennis at the University of Georgia, earning All-American honours in each on his four seasons. He won the 1997 ITA Clay Court Doubles Championships with John Roddick, the brother of Andy.

Junior Grand Slam finals

Doubles: 1 (1 title)

References

External links
 
 

1974 births
Living people
Australian male tennis players
Wimbledon junior champions
Grand Slam (tennis) champions in boys' doubles
Georgia Bulldogs tennis players
Tennis players from Adelaide